Stan Up is Taiwanese Mandopop artist Stanley Huang's 3rd Mandarin studio album. It was released on  16 November 2002 by EMI Music Taiwan. One further edition was released, Stan Up/Make Free 2003 (Deluxe Limitation Edition) (Stan Up/解禁2003(激突CD+VCD超值限量紀念版)) on 2 January 2003 with a bonus DVD containing seven music videos and also an exclusive calendar of "2003 Stanley".

References

2002 albums
Stanley Huang albums